A dragon's egg is a fireworks pyrotechnic star which first burns for a period for a visual effect and then loudly deflagrates. This effect became controversial because of the toxic compounds once used, particularly lead tetroxide (Pb3O4). 

Nowadays, however, bismuth trioxide or bismuth subcarbonate are commonly used as more environmentally friendly substitutes for lead compounds to achieve the effect, and its occurrence in fireworks displays has since become much more common.

Because of how heavy an individual bismuth atom is, a shell or cake containing mainly dragon's eggs (and therefore enriched in bismuth) is often noticeably heavier than a similar device containing other effects.

Further reading

References 

Types of fireworks